James Dever (May 2, 1825 – May 7, 1904) was an Irish-born merchant and political figure in New Brunswick, Canada. He sat for Saint John division in the Senate of Canada from 1868 to 1904 as a Liberal.

He was born in Ballyshannon, the son of James Dever and Catherine Gallagher. He came to New Brunswick with his family while still young and was educated at Saint John. In 1853, he married Margaret Morris. Dever died in office in Ottawa at the age of 79.

References 
 
The Canadian parliamentary companion, 1889 JA Gemmill
Genealogies, Irish Canadian Cultural Association of New Brunswick

1904 deaths
Canadian senators from New Brunswick
Irish emigrants to pre-Confederation New Brunswick
1825 births